The 2012 Colchester Borough Council election took place on 3 May 2012 to elect members of Colchester Borough Council in Essex, England. One third of the council was up for election and the council stayed under no overall control.

After the election, the composition of the council was
Liberal Democrats 26
Conservative 23
Labour 8
Independent 3

Campaign
Before the election a coalition between the Liberal Democrats with 26 seats, Labour with 7 seats and the 3 independents ran the council, while the 24 Conservatives were in opposition. 20 of the seats were contested at the election with the Conservatives aiming to regain seats they had lost at the 2008 election, while the Local Government Information Unit called the election one of the top 50 contests in the 2012 local elections.

The Conservatives called for the council to change to full council elections every four years, for food waste pick ups to be introduced immediately and for a push to keep the town centre clean. However the Liberal Democrats defended their record in leading the council pointing to a freeze in council tax, recycling rates and contrasted their record in control with the former Conservative administration. Meanwhile, Labour was supported during the campaign by a visit from the former Labour cabinet minister Hazel Blears.

Election result
The only change at the election saw Labour gain one seat from the Conservatives in Wivenhoe Quay. Meanwhile, the Liberal Democrats remained the largest party on the council with 26 seats despite losing seats across the country. The existing coalition between the Liberal Democrats, Labour and independents stayed in control of the council after the election.

Ward results

Berechurch

Castle

Dedham & Langham

East Donyland

Harbour

Highwoods

Lexden

Marks Tey

Mile End

New Town

Prettygate

St. Andrew's

St. Anne's

St. John's

Shrub End

Stanway

Tiptree

West Mersea

No Independent candidate as previous (22.8%).

Wivenhoe Cross

Wivenhoe Quay

By-elections

West Mersea

A by-election was called due to the resignation of Cllr Glenn Granger.

References

2012 English local elections
2012
2010s in Essex